Bernardine is a given name.

Bernardine may also refer to:

Bernardine (film), a 1957 film version of the play
Bernardine (grape), another name for the Italian wine grape Prié blanc
Bernardine (play), a 1952 play by Mary Chase
Bernardine (song), a 1957 song performed by Pat Boone for the film of the same name

See also
Bernardines (disambiguation)
Bernardino (disambiguation)
Bernardin
Bernadine
Bernardini (disambiguation)